"Who Put The Devil In You" is the first single from the album Deliverance by Australian rock band You Am I. It was released in 2002 and reached number 79 in that year's Hottest 100.

It was released as an exclusive download from You Am I's website.

Track listing

"You Got Lucky" and "Cream & The Crock" are You Am I originals. A remastered version of the former appeared on the Deliverance single. "Cream & The Crock" is an unreleased live track from ...Saturday Night, 'Round Ten.

References

2002 singles
You Am I songs
2002 songs
Songs written by Tim Rogers (musician)